The Chandler House is a historic house in rural northern White County, Arkansas.  It is located just north of the junction of Stanley and Honeysuckle Roads, northwest of Bald Knob.  It is a two-story wood-frame structure, with weatherboard siding and a gable roof.  A hip-roofed porch extends around its front to the side, supported by square posts, and a shed-roof addition extends to the rear.  The front is symmetrically arranged, three bays wide, with sash windows on either side of the entrance, and a third window in the gable above.  The house was built about 1885, and is probably one of the first gable-entry houses to be built in White County, and one of a very few to survive from the 19th century.

The house was listed on the National Register of Historic Places in 1992.

See also
National Register of Historic Places listings in White County, Arkansas

References

Houses on the National Register of Historic Places in Arkansas
Houses completed in 1885
Houses in White County, Arkansas
National Register of Historic Places in White County, Arkansas
1885 establishments in Arkansas